Bojana Marinković (born 30 October 1996) is a Serbian professional tennis player.

Marinković has a career-high singles ranking of 509 by the Women's Tennis Association (WTA), achieved on 16 October 2017. She also has a career-high doubles ranking by the WTA of 478, reached on 2 August 2021. She has won one singles title and ten doubles titles on the ITF Circuit.

Playing for Serbia Fed Cup team, Marinković has a win–loss record of 0–3.

ITF Circuit finals

Singles: 4 (1 title, 3 runner–ups)

Doubles: 27 (10 titles, 17 runner–ups)

Notes

References

External links
 
 
 

1996 births
Living people
Sportspeople from Novi Sad
Serbian female tennis players